3382  may refer to:
Seven & I Holdings Co. (Tokyo Stock Exchange code: 3382), Japanese retailer
Tianjin Port Development (Hong Kong Stock Exchange code: 3382), Chinese logistics company
3382 BC, a year in the 34th century BC

See also
NGC 3382, two stars in the constellation Leo Minor
3382 Cassidy, a minor planet discovered in 1948
Executive Order 3382 (on Wikisource), an executive order by U.S. president Woodrow Wilson under the Panama Canal Act